Igumale is a town in Benue State Nigeria.

Transport
Igumale is served by a station on the eastern mainline of the national railway network.

Climate
In the town of Igumale, the rainy season is warm, oppressive, and overcast and the dry or sunny season is hot, muggy, and partly cloudy. Over the course of the year, the temperature typically varies from 64 °F to 90 °F and is rarely below 57 °F or above 94 °F.
Based on the beach/pool score, the best time of the year to visit Igumale for hot-weather activities is from mid of November t mid of February.

See also
 Railway stations in Nigeria

References

Populated places in Benue State